Scales Mound is a village in Jo Daviess County, Illinois, United States. The population was 376 at the 2010 census, down from 401 in 2000.

History
The original town of Scales Mound was located at the base of an erosional remnant similar to Charles Mound, about a mile southwest of the present-day village. In 1830 Samuel Scales purchased the original village site from John Sole and built a tavern at the base of the mound along Sucker Trail, a major east-west corridor. The land that the present-day village of Scales Mound is on was purchased from the U.S. government in 1848 by a man named Dunning. Little is known about Dunning or the use of the land until the 1850s.

In 1851 the Illinois Central Railroad (ICRR) was established and it would become a major factor in the settlement of much of rural Illinois, including Scales Mound. In September 1853, anticipating the arrival of the railroad, the village of Scales Mound was platted by Josiah Conlee and B.B. Provost. During the summer of 1854 track crews from ICRR laid out  of track between Scales Mound and Apple River and trains were running the line the day after completion. With the arrival of the railroad, Scales Mound's first building was constructed in the late fall 1854; a store built by Sherman Eddy.

Demographics

As of the census of 2000, there were 401 people, 164 households, and 108 families residing in the village. The racial makeup of the village was 98.25% White, 0.25% Asian, and 1.50% from two or more races. Hispanic or Latino of any race were 3.49% of the population.

There were 164 households, out of which 31.1% had children under the age of 18 living with them, 54.3% were married couples living together, 8.5% had a female householder with no husband present, and 34.1% were non-families. 32.3% of all households were made up of individuals, and 18.3% had someone living alone who was 65 years of age or older.  The average household size was 2.45 and the average family size was 3.08.

In the village, the population was spread out, with 24.9% under the age of 18, 10.0% from 18 to 24, 26.4% from 25 to 44, 19.0% from 45 to 64, and 19.7% who were 65 years of age or older.  The median age was 38 years. For every 100 females, there were 87.4 males.  For every 100 females age 18 and over, there were 85.8 males.

The median income for a household in the village was $35,294, and the median income for a family was $37,386. Males had a median income of $26,875 versus $20,288 for females. The per capita income for the village was $15,992.  About 6.1% of families and 7.8% of the population were below the poverty line, including 12.2% of those under age 18 and 15.3% of those age 65 or over.

Geography

Location
Scales Mound lies at the northwestern tip of Illinois in Jo Daviess County, part of the Driftless Area. Scales Mound is located at  (42.478098, −90.250544) near the highest point in Illinois, Charles Mound, and on the Stagecoach Trail. It has an annual festival, Stagecoach Trail days.

Topography
Scales Mound is located in a region of the U.S. Midwest known as the Driftless Area, so called because it escaped glaciation during the last ice age. It covers parts of Illinois, Wisconsin, Minnesota and Iowa. The Illinois section is mostly limited to Jo Daviess County and small parts of Whiteside and Carroll County in northwest Illinois. The topography of the area is characterized by hilly terrain and wooded ridges. Common features found in the Scales Mound area include canyons, bluffs, ravines and palisades. Near Charles Mound, the highest point in Illinois at 1235 feet, Scales Mound is said to be "At the Top of Illinois".

Climate

Education
Scales Mound has one K-12 school (high school included). Its mascot is the Hornets.

Culture
Scales Mound Historic District

References

External links

Government
Village of Scales Mound
Jo Daviess County
Scales Mound Fire Protection District

Others
Scales Mound School
Scales Mound at City Data

Villages in Jo Daviess County, Illinois
Villages in Illinois
Populated places established in 1853